
Lake Zurich (Swiss German/Alemannic: Zürisee; German: Zürichsee) is a lake in Switzerland, extending southeast of the city of Zürich. Depending on the context, Lake Zurich or Zürichsee can be used to describe the lake as a whole, or just that part of the lake downstream of the Seedamm at Rapperswil, whilst the part upstream of Rapperswil may be called the Obersee or Upper Lake.

Geography 
Lake Zurich is formed by the river Linth, which rises in the glaciers of the Glarus Alps and was diverted by the Escher canal (completed in 1811) into Lake Walen from where its waters are carried to the east end of Lake Zurich by means of the Linth canal (completed in 1816). The waters of the Lake of Zurich flow out of the lake at its north-west end (Quaibrücke), passing through the city of Zürich; however, the outflow is then called the Limmat. The culminating point of the lake's drainage basin is the Tödi at 3,614 metres above sea level.

No streams of importance flow into the lake besides the Linth. The Seedamm, a partially artificial causeway and bridge, crosses a narrow point of the lake carrying a railway line and road from Rapperswil to Pfäffikon. The eastern section of the lake is known as the Obersee ("upper lake"). West of this dam lie the small islands of Lützelau and Ufenau, where in 1523 Ulrich von Hutten took refuge and died. Both shores are well cultivated and fertile. Another tourist destination is the Au peninsula at the village of Au between Wädenswil and Horgen.

To the east – separated by Zürichberg-Adlisberg, Forch and Pfannenstiel – are two minor lakes: Greifensee (Lake Greifen) and Pfäffikersee (Lake Pfäffikon). Zimmerberg and the Etzel regions lie to the west.

Administratively, Lake Zurich is split between the cantons of Zürich, St. Gallen and Schwyz. The lower lake, to the west of the Seedamm, is largely in the canton of Zürich, whilst the upper lake is shared between the cantons of St. Gallen and Schwyz.

History 
The lake was frozen in the following Common Era/Anno Domini years:
 1223, 1259, 1262
 1407, 1491
 1514, 1517, 1573
 1600, 1660, 1684, 1695
 1709, 1716, 1718, 1740, 1755, 1763, 1789
 1830, 1880, 1891, 1895
 1929, 1963

Population and transportation 
The three population and transportation centres are Zurich, Pfäffikon SZ and Rapperswil.

Besides Quaibrücke in Zurich and the Seedamm, there are no bridges across the lake.

The Zürichsee-Schifffahrtsgesellschaft – the Lake Zurich Navigation Company – provides with its 17-passenger ships touristic services on Lake Zurich. There are a number of passenger ferry services, noticeably the Horgen–Meilen ferry, an auto ferry between Horgen and Meilen.

Towns on the lake 
Zürich, at the north-western end of the lake, is the largest city on Lake Zurich.

On the west shore (which gradually becomes the south shore) are Rüschlikon, Thalwil, Horgen, Wädenswil, Richterswil, Pfäffikon, and Lachen.

On the opposite shore are Küsnacht, Meilen, Stäfa, and Rapperswil-Jona with the medieval town of Rapperswil, whose castle is home to the Polish museum. Schmerikon is close to the east end of the lake, and a little further east is the larger town of Uznach.

Water quality
Lake Zurich's water is very clean and reaches, during summer, temperatures well beyond . Swimming in the  public baths and beaches is very popular. The lake's water is purified and fed into Zürich's water system; it is potable.

Prehistoric pile dwellings around Zürichsee 
The Prehistoric pile dwellings around Zürichsee comprises 11 of total 56 Prehistoric pile dwellings around the Alps in Switzerland, that are located around Zürichsee in the cantons of Schwyz, St. Gallen and Zürich.

Located on Zürichsee lakeshore, there are Freienbach–Hurden Rosshorn, Freienbach–Hurden Seefeld, Rapperswil-Jona/Hombrechtikon–Feldbach, Rapperswil-Jona–Technikum, Erlenbach–Winkel, Meilen–Rorenhaab, Wädenswil–Vorder Au, Zürich–Enge Alpenquai, Grosser Hafner and Kleiner Hafner. Also on the small area of about  around Zürichsee are the settlements Greifensee–Storen/Wildsberg on Greifensee and Wetzikon–Robenhausen on Pfäffikersee lakeshore.

As well as being part of the 56 Swiss sites of the UNESCO World Heritage Site, each of these 11 prehistoric pile dwellings is also listed as a Class object in the Swiss inventory of cultural property of national and regional significance.

Tributaries

The following rivers or streams flow into Zürichsee. From the Limmat clockwise, they are:

Hornbach (at Zürichhorn)
Düggelbach (at Zollikon)
Kusenbach (at Küsnacht)
Küsnachter Dorfbach (at Hornelanpark, Küsnacht)
Heslibach (at Erlenbach)
Dorfbach Erlenbach (at Erlenbach)
Tobelbächli (at Erlenbach)
Schipfbach (at Erlenbach)
Rossbach (at Herrliberg)
Meilener Dorfbach (at Meilen)
Beugenbach (at Meilen)
Aebletenbach (at Ländeli)
Uetiker Mulibach (at Meilen)
Feldbach (at Horn)
Sarenbach (at Freienbach)
Krebsbach (at Bäch)
Mülibach (at Richterswil)
Zürichsee (at Wädenswil)
Meilibach (at Wädenswil)
Schanzengraben (Zürich)

Gallery

See also

Obersee (Zürichsee)
Prehistoric pile dwellings around Zürichsee
Paddle steamer Stadt Rapperswil
Paddle steamer Stadt Zürich
Radio Zürisee
Seedamm
Zürichsee-Zeitung

References

External links
 
Zürichsee Schifffahrtsgesellschaft—Boat schedules, mainly non-English.
Zürichsee-Fähre Horgen-Meilen—Ferry schedules, in German.
Waterlevels Lake Zürich at Zürich
Lake Zurich ENC Chart

 
Zurich
Zurich
Zurich
Zurich
LZurich
Schwyz–St. Gallen border